Eduardo Saavedra (27 February 1829 in Tarragona – 12 March 1912 in Madid), Spanish engineer, architect, archaeologist and Arabist, member of the Real Academia de la Historia, Spanish Royal Academy of Sciences, Real Academia Española and cofounder-president of the Real Sociedad Geográfica.

Biography 
In 1857 Eduardo Saavedra designed the highest lighthouse in Spanin - Chipiona Light. In 1860 he discovered Numantia ruins  in the province of Soria and was the chairman of the committee that dealt with the archaeological excavations. While working on the project of roads between Soria and the Burgo de Osma-Ciudad de Osma he discovered the Roman road between Uxama Argaela and  Augustóbriga.

Archeological Studies
"Descripción de la vía romana entre Uxama y Augustóbriga", en Memorias de la Real Academia de la Historia, vol. 9, 1879

Arabic Studies 
 La Geografía de España de El Idrisí, Madrid, 1881.
 Intereses de España en Marruecos, Madrid, 1884.
 Estudio sobre la invasión de los árabes en España, Madrid, 1891.
 La mujer mozárabe, Madrid, 1904.

Bibliography 
 Guijarro, Luis (2006). «Castilla y León, con el sello de norte». Revista del Ministerio de Fomento (553) (Ministerio de Fomento). pp. 80–95. ISSN 1577-4589.
 Mañas Martínez, José (1983), Eduardo Saavedra, Ingeniero y Humanista; prólogo de Julio Caro Baroja, Madrid:Turner-Colegio de Ingenieros de Caminos, Canales y Puertos.
 Manzanares de Cirre, Manuela (1972), Arabistas españoles del siglo XIX, Madrid, Instituto Hispano-Árabe de Cultura.
 Pasamar Alzuria, Gonzalo; Peiró Martín, Ignacio (2002). Diccionario Akal de Historiadores españoles contemporáneos. Ediciones Akal. .

References

External links 

 Obras de Eduardo Saavedra en la Biblioteca Virtual Cervantes
 Eduardo Saavedra en Biografías y vidas
 La ingeniería española y el Canal de Suez. El primer viaje de una fragata española a través del canal (1869) : Exposición Universidad Politécnica de Madrid

1829 births
1912 deaths
Architects from Catalonia
Engineers from Catalonia
20th-century archaeologists
Members of the Royal Spanish Academy
People from Madrid
Spanish Arabists
Spanish orientalists